Charles John Guthrie, Lord Guthrie FRSE FRSGS LLD (4 April 1849 in Edinburgh – 28 April 1920 in Edinburgh) was a Scottish judge and lawyer.

Life

Guthrie was born at 2 Lauriston Lane in Edinburgh, the son of Rev Thomas Guthrie, a major figure in Scottish church history. By 1860 the family had moved to 1 Salisbury Road, a large villa in south Edinburgh.

He was educated at Edinburgh Academy and then studied Law at Edinburgh University graduating around 1871. In 1875, was admitted to the Faculty of Advocates. From 1881 to 1900, he was legal adviser to the Church of Scotland, and in 1897, became a Q.C. From 1900 to 1907 he served as Sheriff of Ross and Cromarty.

In 1907, he was appointed a Senator of the College of Justice. Lord Guthrie was a member of the Royal Commissions on Historical Monuments in Scotland (1908) and on Divorce and Matrimonial Causes (1909), and was Chairman of the Houseletting Commission (1906–07). In 1909, he presided over the trial of Oscar Slater. Guthrie made prejudicial and pejorative comments during his summing up, leading to Scotland’s worst ever miscarriage of justice. Slater was released and pardoned 20 years later.

When he was young, Guthrie had been a friend of Robert Louis Stevenson, and published, in 1914, an appreciation of "Cummy," Stevenson's nurse. His other works include John Knox and his House (1898), and an edition of Knox's History of the Reformation in Scotland (1898), besides contributions to the memoir of his father, Thomas Guthrie (1875). From 1910 to 1919, he was President of the Boys' Brigade of Great Britain and Ireland, and was a member of various antiquarian societies.

In 1916 he was elected a Fellow of the Royal Society of Edinburgh. His proposers were John Horne, Sir William Turner, Sir John Macdonald, Lord Kingsburgh, and John George Bartholomew.

Lord Guthrie died at his home, 13 Royal Circus in Edinburgh, on 28 April 1920. He is buried in the north-west corner of the north section of Dean Cemetery.

Family

In 1876 Guthrie married his cousin, Anne Jemima Burns (1845-1927), the daughter of Rev Dr James Chalmers Burns DD of Kirkliston, and they had two sons and three daughters to the marriage.

References

External links

1849 births
1920 deaths
Lawyers from Edinburgh
People educated at Edinburgh Academy
Alumni of the University of Edinburgh
Scottish lawyers
Members of the Faculty of Advocates
Scottish sheriffs
Presidents of the Royal Scottish Geographical Society